The Bindoon-Julimar Important Bird Area is a fragmented 525 km2 tract of land in the northern Darling Ranges, of south-western Western Australia.  It is about 5 km east of the town of Bindoon and 80 km north of Perth, on the edge of the wheatbelt.  It lies between the Calingiri and Northern Swan Coastal Plain IBAs.

Description
Site boundaries of the IBA are defined by blocks of native vegetation known or expected to support nesting and feeding black cockatoos in several reserves, on private land and a Defence Department training area.  The native vegetation remains in good condition and there are few nest competitors such as galahs, corellas and feral honeybees.  The area has a Mediterranean climate.

Birds
The site has been identified as an Important Bird Area (IBA) by BirdLife International because it supports at least 110 pairs of breeding short-billed black-cockatoos in both breeding and feeding habitat - the largest population of breeding birds in south-western Australia.  The IBA also contains populations of biome-restricted red-capped parrots, rufous treecreepers, western spinebills, western thornbills and western yellow robins.

References

Darling Range
Wheatbelt (Western Australia)
Important Bird Areas of Western Australia